Tinian Naval Base and Naval Air Facility Tinian (NAF Tinian) was a major United States Navy sea and airbase base on Tinian Island, part of the Northern Mariana Islands on the east side of the  Philippine Sea in the Pacific Ocean. The Base was built during World War II to support the many bombers and aircraft fighting and patrolling in the South West Pacific theatre of war as part of the Pacific War. A number of naval facilities were built on the entire island of 101.22 km (39 sq miles). The main port was built at the city and port of San Jose, also called Tinian Harbor. All construction was done by the Navy's Seabees Sixth Construction Brigade with minor help from the 64th Army Engineers, including the main two airports:  West Field and  North Field. United States Army Air Forces operated long-range bombers out of the air base built and maintained by the Seabees.

History
Tinian was taken after the Battle of Tinian, against Empire of Japan, which began on July 24, 1944, and ended on August 1, 1944. The invasion of Tinian was mostly done from troops from Saipan. Seabee construction started during the invasion by the building wooden ramps for the Landing Vehicle Tracked, LVT on one small beach, as 90 percent of Tinian coastline is a cliff face.

Tinian, the third of the three largest islands of the Mariana Islands, is just south of Saipan and is separated by a strait, Saipan Channel, only 3 miles wide. Naval Advance Base Saipan construction started on June 15, 1944. Tinian, north to south, is 12 miles long and east to west 6 miles wide. It has mostly flat terrain, perfect for runways.

Before the invasion of Tinian, Japan had 8,500 troops and 15,700 Japanese civilians on Tinian.  Japan had developed Tinian into a large sugar plantation and sugar refining plant. They had built three small runways on the island. After the Battle of Tinian few Japanese troops and Japanese civilians survived. Seabee first had to remove masive amount of war debris, that which was not repairable. Japanese base facilities that were repairable, were quickly repaired. Most of the city of San Jose was destroyed in the battle of Tinian.

At its peak US 150,000 troops were stationed on the island. The island being 101.22 km2 (39 sq miles) and Manhattan, New York being 36 km2 (13.9 sq miles), the Seabee laid out the base streets like Manhattan, with Manhattan street names.  The small bit of land not built on, was called Central Park. The small town of Sunharon was renamed The Village after Greenwich Village. The Tinian Naval hospital was built near Central Park. The main north-south roads were 8th Ave and Broadway. New York streets named had no connection with the Manhattan Project, unknown to them. Crops and gardens grew supplemental fresh food on the island. North Field was built on a place Japanese construction had already started. Merchant Navy Liberty ships and Victory ships started to unload supplies at the new harbor on August 2, 1944. Before the new harbor was completed cargo was placed in Landing craft tank or type B barges and unloaded on the beaches.

Aguiguan

Aguiguan is a very small island, only 7.01 km2 (2.71 sq mi), just south of Tinian, over the Tinian Channel. Aguiguan had a small group of Japanese troops stationed there. As they were isolated and not hindering Tinian Naval Base, they did not surrender until September 4, 1945, two days after the surrender of Japan. The Aguiguan surrender was hosted by an U.S. Coast Guard Cutter, the USCG 83525.  For the surrender US Navy Admiral Marshall R. Greer received the agreement from Japanese Second Lieutenant Kinichi Yamada.

Naval Base
After the opening of Tinian Harbor, also called San Jose Harbor, the unloading of the many cargo ships took place. The ships supplied the vast air bases, the sea base and the many Troop passing through the island on the island hopping campaign.

Some of the Troops having come from the Kwajalein Atoll and Enewetak Atoll on Navy ships. Submarine Chasers, like PC-1080 and PCSC-1452, patrolled the water around Tinian, hunting for Japanese submarine. Operation Ivory Soap was convoy of ships used to provide aircraft repair and maintenance at Tinian and other Pacific Theatre of Operations.

Some of the many cargo ships that supplied Tinian: USS Rutilicus, USS Ara, USS Grainger, USS Propus, USS Megrez, USS Sagittarius, and USS Alnitah.

On July 26, 1945 USS Indianapolis anchored 1,000 yards off Tinian and unloaded the radioactive parts of the A-bombs. Next the Indianapolis stopped at Guam, then departed for the Philippines, but was hit by two torpedoes by Japanese submarine I58 and sank on July 30, 1945. Indianapolis survivors were found in the ocean three and a half days later.

NAF Tinian - NAB Tinian 
Fleet Air Wing Eighteen, a Navy Patrol Wing move its headquarters to NAF Tinian on May 25, 1945. 
Patrol Squadron One (VP-1) began patrols at Tinian on June 21, 1945. On December 1, 1944 VP-111 Patrol Squadron was transferred to Tinian. US Navy Patrol Wings used PB4Y-1, PB4Y-2, P4M-1 and P2V-6/5F/7S/SP-2H to patrol from Tinian airfilds. On April 30, 1947 NAF Tinian was placed on inactive status and on June 1, 1947 disestablished. NAF Tinia was closed, as it was not close enough to mainland Asia to be useful, as Okinawa is.

Airfields

The  Navy's Seabees built and maintained the six 8,500-feet runways that made up West Field and North Field. At first, the US Navy patrol planes operated from the North Field runways. In November 15, with a West Field runway completed, the Navy moved to West Field. The Navy's West Field had 16,000 feet of taxiway, 70 hardstands, 345 quonset huts, 33 buildings for repair and maintenance facilities, seven ammunition storage magazines and an air control tower.  At its peak, the two airfields were able to handle 2,500 fighter planes and 597 bombers.

After the war, West Field became Tinian airport, named Gurguan Point Airfield, and later renamed Tinian International Airport. The large North Field air bases were mainly used for Boeing B-29 Superfortress that began long-range bombing on the homeland of Japan, 1,500 miles away. By the end of the war 19,000 combat missions were launched against the Japan mainland, through around-the-clock take-offs. The 509th Composite Group's Boeing B-29 Superfortress Enola Gay departed North Field on August 6, 1945, with the atomic bomb named Little Boy dropped on the city of Hiroshima, Japan.

Boeing B-29 Superfortress Bockscar departed North Field on August 9, 1945, with the atomic bomb named Fat Man dropped on the city of Nagasaki, Japan. The Surrender of Japan took place on August 15, with the formal signed on September 2, 1945. Thus ending World War II and avoiding the soon-to-be costly Invasion of Japan.

Facilities 
Tinian Naval Base, and NAS Tinian Facilities:
West Field
North Field, the biggest airport in the world at that time, 20 miles of runways, 425 feet wide.
White Beach, (Unai Chulu Beach) ramp for Landing Vehicle Tracked.
Tinian Breakwater, 4,805 feet long, with cargo ship berthing on the 1,210 feet inner breaker, started November 1944 and completed on March 6, 1945. 
Tinian Harbor, also called San Jose Harbor.
Pontoon pier built
Two masonry piers 
Two Marine railway for boat repairs
Existing road widen and 34 miles of new roads built
Tents housing and staff Quonset huts housing
Barracks for 12,000 Seabees
Barracks for 13,000 Naval personnel
Barracks for 21,500 Army personnel
Barracks for 50 000 marines
Barracks for temporary Troops
Naval hospital 1,000 beds 
Army hospital 600 beds
Camp Churo, Japanese civilians camp, with 100 bed hospital.
Warehouse storage 386,000 square feet, two million sqf open-storage, and 63,000 cf efrigerated storage for:.
Seabees Supply depot
Naval Supply depot
Chapels
Marines Seventh Field Depot
Ammunition storage (separate from other storage)
Bomb storage, 20,000-ton capacity(separate from other storage)
Water supply and purification units (water from wells and Hagoi Lake)
Coral quarry
Large fuel tank farm
Crash boat base
Aviation Overhaul shop
Motor pool
Quartermaster Laundry
Navy Bank
Fleet Post Office FPO# 3247 SF Tinian Island, Marianas Islands
Mess halls
Navy Communication Center
Power stations

Postwar:
 International Broadcasting Bureau Voice of America broadcast site.
 Navy Training Camp, Camp Tinian with Seabees and United States Marine Corps

Camp Churo
Camp Churo was founded by the UN Navy as a place for the post battle of Tinian civilians. Camp Churo civilian internment camp was divided into two camps. One part held 8,278 Japanese and Okinawan civilians, Japan had brought them to the island to work the sugarcane fields. The other part had the 2,357 Koreans that Japan had forced to work the sugarcane fields. At its peak 11,479 were living at Camp Churo, the increase mostly from births. The site was picked as it had a freshwater well. The camp residents were given two meals a day and the offer to work for pay and extra food. Pay for skilled workers was 50 cents a day and 35 cents for unskilled workers, each also had an extra meal. Some typical work offered was landscaping, sweeping, laundry and camp food preparation. The camp had crops and gardens growing extra fresh food. A 3,000-seat school was opened for the children, with Naval officer Lieutenant (j.g.) H. Terjen Mook as head teacher. A craft shop was opened for handcrafted product making. The Navy operated a movie theater some evening. The Navy also operated a 100-bed hospital in the camp. In 1946 the civilians were returned to their homeland.

Post World War II
The Seabees battalion on Tinian was decommissioned on June 20, 1945. During the battle of Tinian five Seabees were killed and 38 received the Purple Heart.  Five Seabees were awarded the Navy and Marine Corps Medal for heroism. In 1947 Tinian was transferred from the US Navy to the Trust Territory of the Pacific Islands, a territory controlled by the United States. While most of the major bases on the island changed to inactive, the United States military was still on the island. In 1962 Tinian transferred to the administration of Saipan as a sub-district. In 1978, Tinian became a municipality in the Commonwealth of the Northern Mariana Islands. In 1983 a 50-year 16,100-acre lease agreement was made, the land is called "Military Lease Area (MLA)". The Lease gives used of the land to the US Navy. US Navy used most of the land area for training exercises in what is called Camp Tinian, a small mostly mobile camp. As part of the lease in the 1980s, one runway at North Field was reactivated so US Air Force C-130s could support of United States Marine Corps training exercises on the leased land. The lease agreement gives the U.S. Department of Defense the option of an added 50 year to the lease. Currently, North Field has only the unused runways remaining. A new Voice of America (VOA) radio relay station was built on Tinian.

Historical markers
At Grand Island, Nebraska is a Tinian Island Historical marker. Grand Island is where the Sixth Bomb Group trained before being deployed to Tinian Island in December 1944.
At North Field is the Marker "No. 2 Bomb Loading Pit" where Fat Man was loaded into Bockscar at 
313th Bomb Wing (VH), Twentieth Air Force marker at United States Air Force Academy, Colorado.
Suicide Cliff in Tinian, is the spot where hundreds of Japanese citizens and troops jumped to their death, rather than surrender in 1944, due to Japanese propaganda and brainwashing.

Gallery

See also

770th Bombardment Squadron
XXI Bomber Command
Twentieth Air Force
Rail transport on the Mariana Islands
U.S. Naval Base Subic Bay
Espiritu Santo Naval Base
US Naval Advance Bases
Naval Advance Base Saipan
Service Squadron

External links
youtube.com, Tinian Island and the Atomic Bomb - Wrecks of Saipan
 youtube.com, Battle of Tinian 1944 / Part 1 - The Perfect Amphibious Operation
B 29s on Tinian by Irv Winkler (R9)
youtube "They Came To An Island" U.S. Navy Civil Engineer Corps Wwii Seabees Construction Battalions 29564

References

Airfields of the United States Navy
Military installations closed in the 1940s
Closed installations of the United States Navy
Tinian Naval Base
Islands of the Northern Mariana Islands
Atomic bombings of Hiroshima and Nagasaki